Statmetrics is a free cross-platform software application providing an interactive environment for computational finance. Statmetrics is an analytical tool which offers several modeling techniques to analyze selected markets and integrates widely implemented quantitative finance technologies in addition with contemporary econometric analysis methods. Statmetrics can be used in diverse fields to perform econometric analysis, technical analysis, risk management, portfolio management and asset allocation.

See also
Econometrics
Computational finance
Technical analysis
Modeling and analysis of financial markets

References

External links
Official Website
RoyalQ Trading Bot
Decentralized Trading Platform

Financial markets
Financial software
Financial markets software
Technical analysis software
Cross-platform software
Java platform software